The discography of Danish pop artist Medina consists of seven studio albums. Three of these have spawned commercially successful singles that have peaked at number one on the official Danish singles chart. In total, Medina has forty-three singles with her most successful one internationally being "You and I".

Tæt på, Medina's debut Danish studio album, was released in September 2007. She released the singles in Denmark titled "Flå", "Et øjeblik" and "Alene" in 2007 and released "Okay" in 2008.

Velkommen til Medina, Medina's second Danish studio album, was released in August 2009. She rose to national fame in 2008 with the release of "Kun for mig" (which was later released as the English "You and I"). The single spent six weeks at number 1 on the Danish Singles Chart. The second single off the album, "Velkommen til Medina" also peaked at number 1 in Denmark which spent five weeks at the top of chart. Even Medina's third and fourth single, "Ensom" and "Vi to peaked at number 2 in Denmark.

Welcome to Medina, Medina's debut English studio album, was released in July 2010. In September 2009, Medina released an English-language version of "Kun for mig", titled "You and I", in the UK, Germany, Austria and Switzerland. This version reached number 39 on the UK Singles Chart and entered the Top 10 on the German Singles Chart.

For altid, Medina's third Danish studio album, was released in September 2011. The first three single from the album "For altid", "Synd for dig" and "Kl. 10" peaked to number 1 in Denmark. "12 dage", "Lyser i mørke" and "Har du glemt" also entered the Top 10 in Denmark.

Forever, Medina's second English studio album, was released in June 2012. The album includes the singles "Forever", "Happening", "Boring (It's Too Late)" and "Waiting for Love". A second edition of the album was released entitled Forever 2.0.

Tæt På - Live, Medina's debut Live album, was released in March 2014. The album includes the single "Jalousi" which peaked to number 1 on the Danish Singles Chart.

Albums

Danish studio albums

English studio albums

Live albums

Extended plays

Singles

Danish singles

Non-Danish singles

As a featured artist

Promotional singles

Other charted songs

Guest appearances

Music videos

Footnotes

References

Discographies of Danish artists
Pop music discographies